Jaye Cori Locker Boissiere (born February 16, 1996) is an American professional soccer player who plays as a midfielder for National Women's Soccer League (NWSL) club Washington Spirit.

Club career

Washington Spirit
Boissiere made her NWSL debut in the 2020 NWSL Challenge Cup on July 1, 2020.

References

External links
 Stanford profile

1996 births
Living people
American women's soccer players
Soccer players from California
Sportspeople from Palo Alto, California
Women's association football midfielders
Stanford Cardinal women's soccer players
Washington Spirit players
American expatriate women's soccer players
Expatriate women's footballers in France
American expatriate sportspeople in France
National Women's Soccer League players